Shaji Chen (also credited as Shaji and Shaji Chennai) is an Indian writer and actor. Shaji's main area of writing is music and cinema related. Shaji writes in Tamil, Malayalam, English languages and acts in Tamil, Telugu and Malayalam films.

Writing 
As a writer he is known for his music and film related write-ups and autobiographical articles. His various articles have published in The Hindu, Times of India, India Today, AV Max, Ananda Vikatan, The Hindu Tamil, Uyirmmai, Kalachuvadu, Theeranadhi, Vikatan Thadam, Kaalam, Kumkumam, Puthiya Thalaimurai, Sunday Indian, Andhimazhai, Padachurul, Bhashaposhini, Mathrubhumi Azhchappathippu, Madhyamam Weekly, Chandrika Weekly, Kalakaumudi, Malayalam Vaarika, Mangalam Daily, Mangalam Annual, Deepika Daily and others.

His articles in the series Music Beyond Words were translated to Tamil by Tamil writer Jeyamohan as Sollil Adangaatha Isai. Published in the Tamil literary magazine Uyirmmai, this was a popular column in the Tamil serious literature. Another Tamil writer S. Ramakrishnan has also translated many of Shaji's articles to Tamil. After the first few years of these translations, Shaji started writing directly in Tamil. In 2016 a complete collection of his music-related articles was published by Vikatan Publications. In the 2023 Chennai Book Fair an updated and improved collection of his music-related articles published by Discovery Books. Director Mani Ratnam, Director Mysskin, Director Vasanth, Director Seenu Ramasamy, Director Vasanthabalan and Actor composer G. V. Prakash Kumar introduced and endorsed the book.   

His column named Paattinappuram (Beyond the Song), was published in the Malayalam weekly Chandrika. His first Book in Malayalam, 'Paattalla Sangeetham', was released by Malayalam publisher Green Books. Many of his Malayalam articles are published in the notable literary magazine of Malayalam, Bhashaposhini and his article series named Cinema Bhraanthinte Naalpathu Varshangal (40 Years of Cinema Craze) was published therein for one year in 2017–18. Portions from this series were also published as shorter chapters in Malayala Manorama Online. In 2019 October, Matrubhumi Books published this series as a book  and it went on to be a best seller in the first week of the publication itself.

As a music critic, Shaji appeared in national dailies such as Times of India, The Hindu, Deccan Chronicle, New Indian Express, and others. His monthly column in Tamil 'Cinema Veriyin 40 Aandukal'' was published in Vikatan Thadam Magazine. The last 2 chapters of the same were published in Andhimazhai Magazine. His columns in Tamil, Mullarumbu Marangal in Andhimazhai monthly and Isaiyezhuthu in Uyirmai monthly are well known. In Malayalam, the web magazine Truecopythink publishes most of his writings from 2020.

Shaji has also worked in the advertising industry for many years providing storylines, scripts, jingle lyrics, and translations and he also acted in some advertisements. He has written many advertisement films and ad campaigns. He worked for brands such as Ford, Saint-Gobain Glass, South Indian Bank, Muthoot Fincorp, Nippo Nippon, Asian Paints, Vodafone and others.

Bibliography

Acting 
In September 2013 Shaji Chen acted in the acclaimed Tamil film Onaayum Aattukkuttiyum (A Wolf and a Lamb) directed by Mysskin, as the pivotal character CBCID Lal. Then he acted in the Tamil film Maan Karate as the boxing coach of the hero, Sivakarthikeyan. Aaranyam was his next Tamil film. He made his Malayalam film debut with the Vineeth Sreenivasan film Aby. Thupparivalan(Tamil) / Detective (Telugu)/ Dashing Detective (Hindi) directed by Mysskin, Spyder (Telugu &Tamil) directed by A R Murugadoss and Savarakathi written and produced by Mysskin followed. In Thupparivalan he acted as the crucial character ACP Vijayakumar. This film was later dubbed into Telugu as Detective and to Hindi as Dashing Detective. In the film Spyder, he portrayed the role of Intelligence Bureau Head, Mathews. In Savarakathi he played the cameo of a mentally ill person. In Kanne Kalaimaane directed by Seenu Ramasamy he played the role of Bank Manager Mathrubhootham. In Iruttu directed by V. Z. Durai he played the role of a Muslim sage living in a forest graveyard. In Psycho directed by Mysskin he played the part of the father of the heroine acted by Aditi Rao Hydari. In Doctor  directed by Nelson Dilipkumar Shaji played a two scene cameo as a distressed metro train driver. In the Vijay starrer movie Beast directed by Nelson Dilipkumar he acted as the scheming Home Minister. In Maamanithan directed by Seenu Ramasamy Shaji acted as the real estate fraudster Mathavan. in Cobra (2022) directed by R. Ajay Gnanamuthu Shaji did the short cameo of the father of one of the heroines played by Mirnalini Ravi. Chera (Malayalam) directed by Lijin Jose, Raavana Kottam directed by Vikram Sukumaran, Thalaimai Seyalagam directed by Vasanthabalan, Blackmail directed by Mu.Maran, Hitlist directed by SooriKarthik are some of his forthcoming films.

Filmography

 Onaayum Aattukkuttiyum (Tamil – 2013)
 Maan Karate (Tamil – 2014)
 Aaranyam (Tamil – 2015)
 Aby (Malayalam – 2017)
 Thupparivaalan (Tamil – 2017)
 Spyder (Telugu – 2017)
 Spyder (Tamil – 2017)
 Detective (Telugu – 2017)
 Savarakathi (Tamil – 2018) Cameo
 Kanne Kalaimaane (Tamil – 2019)
 Iruttu (Tamil – 2019)
 Sugar (Tamil - Delayed)
 Psycho (Tamil – 2020)
 Doctor (Tamil – 2021) Cameo
 Beast (Tamil - 2022)
 Maamanithan (Tamil – 2022)
 Cobra (Tamil - 2022) Cameo
 Chera (Malayalam - Post production)
 Raavana Kottam (Tamil - Post-production) Cameo
 Devil (Tamil - Filming) Cameo
 Thalaimai Seyalagam (Tamil Web Series - Filming)
 Blackmail (Tamil - Filming)
 Hitlist (Tamil - Post Production) Cameo

In music industry 
Shaji Chen has worked with Indian and international music companies such as Magnasound, Saregama HMV and others in various capacities such as Artistes & Repertoire Manager, Recording Manager, Marketing Manager and Music Consultant.

Voluntary work 
Shaji Chen is the Trustee in South India for the Salil Chowdhury Foundation of Music formed in the name of the notable composer of Indian popular music. He also represents Ritwik Ghatak Memorial Trust in South India. He has also been the Judge of Sujatha Ilakkiya Viruthu, a Tamil literary award instituted in the name of the Tamil writer Sujatha. Shaji Chen is an advocate of informal education for children and the rights of special children. He is also a supporter of sustainable nature farming and native food culture.

Personal life 
Shaji Chen was born in Kattappana, Idukki District, Kerala near the Tamil Nadu border. He lives in Chennai with his wife and daughter.

References 

Living people
Tamil writers
Writers from Chennai
Indian film critics
Male actors from Chennai
Male actors in Tamil cinema
Male actors in Telugu cinema
Male actors in Malayalam cinema
Year of birth missing (living people)